The People's Party of La Rioja (PP) is the regional section of the People's Party of Spain (PP) in La Rioja. It was formed in 1989 from the re-foundation of the People's Alliance.

Electoral performance

Parliament of La Rioja

Cortes Generales

European Parliament

Notes

People's Party (Spain)
Political parties in La Rioja (Spain)